Sculpture is the art of shaping figures or designs in the round or in relief, or a work of art created by sculpting.

Sculpture may also refer to:
Sculpture (Lindberg), 2005 orchestral composition by Magnus Lindberg
Sculpture (magazine)
Sculpture (mollusc), the three-dimensional ornamentation on the outer surface of a shell, as distinct from the basic shape of the shell itself or colouration.

See also
 
 Statue